The 2001 Motor City Bowl was a National Collegiate Athletic Association bowl game in which the Toledo Rockets of the MAC defeated the Cincinnati Bearcats of the Conference USA 23–16.  It was played on December 29, 2001 at the Pontiac Silverdome in Pontiac, Michigan. This was the last Bowl game that was played in the Pontiac Silverdome.

The Bearcats were C-USA runners-up fresh off the wins from five of their last six games, which included Syracuse and #20 Southern Mississippi. Toledo was the Mid-American Conference Champ defeating Marshall 41–36 in the 2001 MAC Championship Game.

This game marked the first time the Rockets appeared in the Motor City Bowl while the Bearcats had lost its previous iteration. Rockets running back Chester Taylor rushed for a bowl record 190 yards on 31 carries and the game-winning touchdown. Cincinnati got the ball back but Toledo safety Andy Boyd knocked a potentially game-tying pass out of the hands of Ray Jackson in the end zone. Taylor was selected as MVP of the game.

Scoring summary

References 

Motor City Bowl
Little Caesars Pizza Bowl
Cincinnati Bearcats football bowl games
Toledo Rockets football bowl games
Motor City Bowl
Motor City Bowl